The Atlanta Hawks are an American professional basketball team based in Atlanta, Georgia. They play in the Southeast Division of the Eastern Conference in the National Basketball Association (NBA). The team began playing in 1946 as a member of the National Basketball League (NBL), and joined the NBA in 1949. The team has had five names since its inception; the Buffalo Bisons (1946), the Tri-Cities Blackhawks (1946–1951), the Milwaukee Hawks (1951–1955), the St. Louis Hawks (1955–1968), and the Atlanta Hawks (1968–present). The Hawks won their only NBA championship in 1958, and have not returned to the NBA Finals since 1960. The team has played its home games at the Philips Arena since 1999. The Hawks are owned by Atlanta Spirit, LLC, and Danny Ferry is their general manager.

There have been 30 head coaches for the Hawks franchise since joining the NBA. The team's first head coach while in the NBA was Roger Potter, who coached for seven games. Richie Guerin, who coached the Hawks for eight seasons, is the franchise's all-time leader in regular-season games coached (618), regular-season games won (327), playoff games coached (60), and playoff games won (26). Alex Hannum is the only head coach to have won an NBA championship with the Hawks, doing so in the 1958 NBA Finals. Five Hawks coaches have won the NBA Coach of the Year Award, four have been elected into the Basketball Hall of Fame as coaches, and three were listed among the Top 10 Coaches in NBA History in 1996. The current head coach is Quin Snyder.

Key

Coaches
Note: Statistics are correct through February 21, 2023, after McMillan's firing. This list does not include NBL seasons.

Notes
 A running total of the number of coaches of the Hawks. Thus, any coach who has two or more separate terms as head coach is only counted once.
 Each year is linked to an article about that particular NBA season.

References
General

Specific

Lists of National Basketball Association head coaches by team

Head coaches